Apareiodon is a genus of scrapetooths from South America where they are found as far south as Río de la Plata. There are currently fifteen described species in this genus.

Species
 Apareiodon affinis (Steindachner, 1879) (Darter characine)
 Apareiodon agmatos Taphorn, López-Fernández & C. R. Bernard, 2008
 Apareiodon argenteus Pavanelli & Britski, 2003
 Apareiodon cavalcante Pavanelli & Britski, 2003
 Apareiodon davisi Fowler, 1941
 Apareiodon gransabana W. C. Starnes & I. Schindler, 1993
 Apareiodon hasemani C. H. Eigenmann, 1916
 Apareiodon ibitiensis Amaral Campos, 1944
 Apareiodon itapicuruensis C. H. Eigenmann & Henn, 1916
 Apareiodon machrisi Travassos, 1957
 Apareiodon orinocensis Bonilla, Machado-Allison, Silvera, Chernoff, López Rojas & Lasso, 1999
 Apareiodon piracicabae (C. H. Eigenmann, 1907)
 Apareiodon tigrinus Pavanelli & Britski, 2003
 Apareiodon vittatus Garavello, 1977
 Apareiodon vladii Pavanelli, 2006

References
 

Fish of South America
Characiformes genera
Taxa named by Carl H. Eigenmann
Parodontidae